Barakeh may refer to:

Mohammad Barakeh, Israeli politician
Berekeh (disambiguation), places in Iran